Osman Nuri Hadžić (28 June 1869 – 23 December 1937) was a Bosnian intellectual and writer. On 1 May 1900, he co-launched the political journal Behar with Safvet beg Bašagić and Edhem Mulabdić.

Biography
Hadžić was educated in Sarajevo, Vienna and Zagreb, where he earned a diploma in 1899. He first served in the district court in his hometown Mostar, as well as Sarajevo. Hadžić later served in the Provincial Government in Sarajevo. During the First World War, he was a manager in Dubica and Banja Luka, where he was when the Austro-Hungarian Empire collapsed.

Personal life
Hadžić had four daughters; daughter Bahrija (4 March 1904 – 24 October 1993) was a soprano singer.

Works
Muhammed i Koran – kulturna istorija islama ("Muhammed and the Quran: A Cultural History of Islam"; 1931)

References

1869 births
1937 deaths
Writers from Mostar
Bosniaks of Bosnia and Herzegovina
Bosnia and Herzegovina Muslims
People from the Ottoman Empire of Bosnian descent
19th-century writers from the Ottoman Empire
Bosniak writers